4765 Wasserburg is a bright Hungaria asteroid, suspected binary system and asteroid pair from the innermost regions of the asteroid belt, approximately  in diameter. It was discovered on 5 May 1986, by American astronomer Carolyn Shoemaker at Palomar Observatory, and later named after geologist Gerald J. Wasserburg.

Orbit and classification 

Wasserburg is a bright member of the Hungaria family, which form the innermost dense concentration of asteroids in the Solar System. It orbits the Sun in the inner main-belt at a distance of 1.8–2.1 AU once every 2 years and 9 months (991 days). Its orbit has an eccentricity of 0.06 and an inclination of 24° with respect to the ecliptic.

Naming 

This minor planet was named after American Gerald J. Wasserburg (1927–2016), who was a professor of geology and geophysics at Caltech in California. He was a pioneer of radiometric dating methods used in isotope geochemistry and was prominent for his accurate age determination measurements of moon rocks, which were instrumental for reconstructing the origin of the Moon and for the hypothesis of the Late Heavy Bombardment. Wasserburg also carried out isotopic analyses of meteorites, developed a time scale for the formation and evolution of the Solar System, and contributed to the theory of nucleosynthesis. The  was published on 27 June 1991.

Physical characteristics

Diameter and albedo 

According to preliminary results from the survey carried out by NASA's Wide-field Infrared Survey Explorer (WISE) with its subsequent NEOWISE mission, Wasserburg measures 1.777 kilometers in diameter and its surface has an outstandingly high albedo of 1.000, while the Collaborative Asteroid Lightcurve Link assumes it to be an E-type asteroid, with albedo of 0.40 – derived from 434 Hungaria the family's namesake and most prominent member – and calculates a larger diameter of 3.82 kilometers with an absolute magnitude of 13.7.

Rotation period 

Between 2006 and 2014, several rotational lightcurves of Wasserburg were obtained from photometric observations by astronomers Brian Warner at his Palmer Divide Observatory, Petr Pravec at Ondřejov Observatory, and Julian Oey at Blue Mountains Observatory. Best rated lightcurve analysis gave a well-defined rotation period between 3.6231 and 3.6280 hours with a brightness variation between 0.07 and 0.60 magnitude. Due to the changing amplitude, Wasserburg is likely one of the more elongatedly shaped primary asteroids of all known smaller binaries with an diameter of less than 10 kilometers.

Satellite 

After being already recognized as an asteroid pair, American astronomer Brian Warner observed faint mutual eclipsing and occultation events in April 2013. After repeated lightcurve subtraction, he was able to show that Wasserburg is likely a binary system with a minor-planet moon orbiting it every 15.97 hours. The Johnston's archive derives a diameter of  meters for the satellite, based on the primary diameter given by WISE. A semi-major axis of 2.9 kilometers is also estimated for the moons orbit. However, photometric observations taken in 2015, could not detect the presence of a satellite and Wasserburg remains only a suspected binary.

Notes

References

External links 
 Asteroids with Satellites, Robert Johnston, johnstonsarchive.net
 Lightcurve Database Query (LCDB), at www.minorplanet.info
 Dictionary of Minor Planet Names, Google books
 Asteroids and comets rotation curves, CdR – Geneva Observatory, Raoul Behrend
 Discovery Circumstances: Numbered Minor Planets (1)-(5000) – Minor Planet Center
 
 

004765
Discoveries by Carolyn S. Shoemaker
Named minor planets
004765
19860505